Frederic W. "Fritz" Knaak (born January 2, 1953) is an American lawyer and politician.

Knaak was born in Rochester, Minnesota. He lived in White Bear Lake, Minnesota with his family and graduated from White Bear Lake High School in 1971. He graduated from Saint John's University, in Collegeville, Minnesota, in 1975. He then received his J.D. degree from the University of Minnesota Law School in 1978. He practiced law in White Bear Lake, Minnesota. Knaak served in the Minnesota Senate from 1983 to 1992 and was a Republican. His mother Delores J. Knaak also served in the Minnesota Legislature.

Notes

1953 births
Living people
Politicians from Rochester, Minnesota
People from White Bear Lake, Minnesota
College of Saint Benedict and Saint John's University alumni
University of Minnesota Law School alumni
Minnesota lawyers
Republican Party Minnesota state senators